Bobby McCarty (born September 28, 1992) is an American professional stock car racing driver. He last competed part-time in the NASCAR Xfinity Series, driving the No. 47 for Mike Harmon Racing and the No. 6 for JD Motorsports.

Racing career

CARS Late Model Stock Tour 
In 2018, McCarty would run his first full-time season in the series, signing with Nelson Motorsports. He would manage to earn his first victory at the first race of the season at Tri-County Motor Speedway. By the seventh race of the 12 race season, he would manage to score three more wins. By season's end, he had managed to lock up the championship, scoring his first championship in the series.

In 2019, he would run full-time again for Nelson Motorsports. Despite having a self-called "up-and-down" season according to McCarty, by the final race at South Boston Speedway, he had managed to pull a nine-point lead over Josh Berry. At race's end, he had managed to win his second straight championship in the series.

During the 2021 CARS Late Model Stock Tour season, McCarty would manage to hold off Kaden Honeycutt in the final race at South Boston Speedway to take his third Late Model Stock division title.

NASCAR Xfinity Series 
On July 4, 2022, McCarty would announce that he would attempt to make his debut in the NASCAR Xfinity Series at the 2022 Crayon 200 at New Hampshire Motor Speedway, driving the No. 47 Chevrolet for Mike Harmon Racing. However, McCarty would fail to qualify for the race, becoming the only non-qualifier for the race. Later in the season, he would make his official debut driving the No. 6 Chevrolet for JD Motorsports, qualifying by using an owner's points provisional in the last position, which was 38th. McCarty would eventually manage to finish in 31st.

Motorsports career results

NASCAR
(key) (Bold – Pole position awarded by qualifying time. Italics – Pole position earned by points standings or practice time. * – Most laps led. ** – All laps led.)

Xfinity Series

References

External links 

 

1992 births
Living people
People from Summerfield, North Carolina
Racing drivers from North Carolina
Sportspeople from North Carolina
JD Motorsport drivers
21st-century American people